Vasile Zavoda, known as Zavoda II or Tigrul Akbar (26 July 1929 – 14 July 2014), was a Romanian football defender and manager. Between 1951 and 1962 he played 20 matches for Romania, including one at the 1952 Olympics. Domestically he competed through 1964 in the Romanian Divizia A, accumulating 257 games. After retiring from competitions he worked as an assistant coach for Steaua București in 1977–81.

Overview 
Zavoda played for Metalul Baia Mare between 1947 and 1951, before joining Steaua București.  In 1964, aged 35, Zavoda played his last season, for ASA Târgu Mureş. Zavoda played 257 games in Romania's Divizia A and scored two goals.  He also won 20 caps for Romania, the first in 1951 against Czechoslovakia, the last one in 1962 against East Germany. He played for Romania at the 1952 Summer Olympics.

He was the younger brother of Francisc Zavoda. Until his death he lived in Bucharest, in the same block of flats with his great friend and former teammate Ion Voinescu.  The couple met every day to discuss football and Steaua București.

Honours

Club

Steaua București
Romanian League (6):  1951, 1952, 1953, 1956, 1959–60, 1960–61
Romanian Cup (4): 1951, 1952, 1955, 1961–62

References

External links
 
 
 
 

1929 births
2014 deaths
CS Minaur Baia Mare (football) players
People from Bistrița-Năsăud County
Romanian footballers
Romania international footballers
Liga I players
Liga II players
FC Steaua București players
ASA Târgu Mureș (1962) players
FC Steaua București assistant managers
Olympic footballers of Romania
Footballers at the 1952 Summer Olympics
Association football defenders